Bagh-e Chenar or Bagh Chenar or Baghchenar may refer to:
 Bagh Chenar, Chaharmahal and Bakhtiari
 Bagh-e Chenar, Hormozgan